Tigerlily is the third and final album by the Canadian rock band Lillix, released in Canada on 24 August 2010.

Track listing

Singles 
 "Nowhere to Run" – August 2010
 "Back Up Girl" – March 2011

Band members 
 Tasha-Ray Evin – lead vocals, guitar, bass guitar
 Lacey-Lee Evin – lead vocals, keyboard
 Eric Hoodicoff – drums, guitar, vocals
 Alex Varon – guitar

References 

Lillix albums
2010 albums